Illesheim Army Heliport  is a military heliport in Illesheim, a small municipality in Bavaria, Germany. The airfield is part of the Storck Barracks and serves as a base for a rotating contingent of U.S. Army Aviation forces in support of Operation Atlantic Resolve.

References

Airports in Bavaria
United States Army posts